Naoise O'Haughan, also known as Neesy, Ness and Nessie (1691–1720) was a highwayman in County Antrim, Ireland in the late 17th and early 18th centuries.

The wild rolling hills of Antrim - Divis and Black Mountain - provided an ideal environment for O'Haughan. He is  said to have hidden in caves at the Hatchet Field on the Black Mountain West of Belfast, before he was captured and hanged at 'The Three Sisters', the gallows green, near Carrickfergus Castle in 1720.

References

1691 births
1720 deaths
County Antrim
Executed Irish people
Irish highwaymen
People executed by the Kingdom of Ireland by hanging
People executed by the Kingdom of Ireland
People executed for robbery